Fort Hunter Historic District is a national historic district located at Fort Hunter, Dauphin County, Pennsylvania.  The district includes six contributing buildings, four contributing sites, and one contributing structure.   The area has seen continuous settlement since the early 1700s and once was the site of an early supply fort and garrison.  Also in the district are the remains of a section of the Pennsylvania Canal.  Notable buildings include the separately listed Archibald McAllister House, a spring house, Everhart Covered Bridge, large frame barn (1876), corn crib, farm house, blacksmith shop, stone stable barn, Hunter's House or Old Hotel, ice house, and archaeological sites for Fort Hunter, the garrison, Hunter's Mill, and the Pennsylvania Canal.

It was added to the National Register of Historic Places in 1979.

References

Historic districts on the National Register of Historic Places in Pennsylvania
Georgian architecture in Pennsylvania
Historic districts in Dauphin County, Pennsylvania
Hunter
National Register of Historic Places in Dauphin County, Pennsylvania
Blacksmith shops